Emil Bergholt (born 25 August 1997) is a Danish handball player for Skjern Håndbold and the Danish national team.

Career 
Bergholt played as a junior for Skjern Håndbold, where he also started his senior career in 2014. With Skjern he won the Danish Cup twice. In 2017 he left for the second division club TM Tønder, where he ended up staying for two seasons. He shifted to Mors-Thy Håndbold in 2019, and won the Danish Cup again in 2020. Since 2021 he's back in Skjern Håndbold.

He made his debut for the Danish national team on 9 March 2023, scoring one goal.

Achievements
Danish Handball Cup: 
Winner: 2014, 2016, 2020

References

1997 births
Living people
Danish male handball players
People from Ringkøbing-Skjern Municipality